Coyote Wash, an arroyo, and ephemeral stream or wash running east from the Jacumba Mountains through Coyote Wells where it broadens into a wide sandy wash, takes in Myer Creek, South Fork Coyote Wash, Palm Canyon Wash and passes Sackett's Wells, then a point 1.5 miles the north of Plaster City, from which it flows toward the New River, where it sinks into the sands just below sea level, west of the river, in the Yuha Desert in Imperial County, California.

History
Sackett's Wells a well on the route of the desert crossing of the Southern Emigrant Trail from the Colorado River Yuma Crossings to coastal Southern California was located on Coyote Wash.  Sackett's Wells was the site of one of the later stagecoach stations of the 2nd Division of the Butterfield Overland Mail.  It was established as a place to provide water and to hold a change of coach teams mid way between the original stations in the desert regions of the route.

References

Coyote Wash (California)
Geography of the Colorado Desert
Rivers of Southern California